The Worshipful Company of Hackney Carriage Drivers is one of the 110 livery companies of the City of London. Its members are professional hackney carriage drivers, including London black taxicab drivers who have learnt the knowledge of London.

The Fellowship of Hackney Carriage Drivers was recognised by the City of London Corporation in 1990 and was granted livery in February 2004, becoming the Worshipful Company. The process started with an instruction from Oliver Cromwell to the City's Court of Aldermen in 1654 on regulating drivers. Legislation created the Fellowship of Master Hackney Coachmen, the first such society for taxi drivers.

The company's charity supports any deserving members and their immediate family. It has run an annual taxi tour to Disneyland Paris for children with life-threatening illnesses each year since 1994. Its education programme teaches taxi drivers about the history of London and it seeks to promote public awareness about the high standards of the hackney carriage trade. The company also takes part in the annual Lord Mayor's Show.

The Hackney Carriage Drivers' Company ranks 104th in the order of precedence of City Livery Companies.

References

External links
WCoHCD Official Site
The Cab Driver Newspaper the licensed taxi industry's oldest and largest independent newspaper
 An Ordinance for the Regulation of Hackney-Coachmen in London and the places adjacent. June 1654

Hackney Carriage Drivers
Taxis of London
1990 establishments in England